Joelma may refer to:

 Joelma (singer) (born 1974), Brazilian singer, former vocalist of the duo Banda Calypso
 Joelma (EP), 2016
 Joelma (album), 2016
 Joelma Sousa (born 1984), Brazilian sprinter
 Joelma Viegas (born 1986), Angolan handball player
 Joelma Building, a skyscraper in São Paulo, Brazil, notable for a 1974 fire that killed 179 people